Yekutiel  or Yekusiel may refer to:

First name
 Yekutiel Adam (1927–1982), Israeli general 
 Yekutiel Berman (1825–), Russian Hebrew writer
 Yekutiel Gordon, 18th century Kabbalist and physician from Vilna
 Yekusiel Yehuda Teitelbaum (I) of Sighet (1808–1883)
 Yekusiel Yehuda Teitelbaum (II) (1911–1944), Chief Rabbi of Sighet
 Yekusiel Yehuda Teitelbaum (III) (born 1952), Satmar Rebbe, known in Yiddish as Zalman Leib Teitelbaum
 Yekutiel Gershoni, Israeli historian and a former paralympic champion
 Yekutiel, another name of Moses in Jewish tradition

Surname
 Gal Yekutiel (born 1981), Israeli judoka